The Arquivo Histórico Ultramarino (est. 1931) of Portugal preserves archives related to the Portuguese Empire. The  of the governmental Ministry of Science, Technology and Higher Education administers the archives. Prior to 1973, the Overseas Ministry oversaw it.

Among its holdings are records created in 15th-20th century related to colonial Angola, Brazil, Cape Verde, Guinea, India, Macau, Mozambique, São Tomé and Príncipe, Timor, Uruguay, and other locales. As of 1970 the materials were grouped as pre-1833 (mostly from the Arquivo do Conselho Ultramarino) and post-1833 (from the Arquivo do Ministerio das Colonias).

Directors have included Alberto Iria (circa 1970).

See also
 Arquivo Histórico Diplomatico of the Ministry of Foreign Affairs (Portugal) 
 List of archives in Portugal

References

This article incorporates information from the Portuguese Wikipedia.

Bibliography
issued by the Archives
 Legislacao Colonial
 Anuario Colonial
 Arquivo das Colonias
 Coleccao dos Classicos da expansao Portuguesa no mundo

abou the Archives
 
 
 
 
  (Account of research in the AHU)
  (Letter from academics against integration of the Arquivo at the University of Lisbon)

External links

 Official site
 OCLC WorldCat. Arquivo Histórico Ultramarino (Portugal)

Images
Examples of items in the AHU:

Organisations based in Lisbon
Archives in Portugal
Portuguese Empire
1931 establishments in Portugal